Mamboicus is a genus of beetles in the family Carabidae, containing the following species:

 Mamboicus afrellus (H. W. Bates, 1886)
 Mamboicus bittencourtae (Bulirsch, 2021)
 Mamboicus conradti (Bänninger, 1939)
 Mamboicus granulipennis (H. W. Bates, 1886)
 Mamboicus heterosculptus Bänninger, 1929
 Mamboicus hypocrita (Bänninger, 1929)
 Mamboicus langenhani (Bänninger, 1933)
 Mamboicus lastii H. W. Bates, 1886
 Mamboicus methneri Bänninger, 1929
 Mamboicus nguruensis Bulirsch, 2016
 Mamboicus ochryopoides Bänninger, 1929
 Mamboicus semigranulatus (Bänninger, 1929)

References

Scaritinae